Sabse Funny Kaun? is a 2020 Indian stand-up comedy show hosted by actor and comedian Varun Sharma. The show is an original series of Flipkart Video which was launched on Flipkart app on 28 September 2020.

Show format 
It is a Hindi-language show where the participants perform their act and then contend against one another. The show features a round-robin format where participants are eliminated after a number of losses. Each episode lasts for a little over 10 minutes and at the end of each episode, one winner is declared who moves ahead in the competition. Any four contestants who get the most votes from viewers will go to the semi-final round. In the final round, two contestants will face off against each other and the cumulative scores of all rounds will be used to determine the winner.

Host 

 Varun Sharma

Contestants 
The show features the following contestants

 Inder Sahani
 Dr. Bhuvan Mohini
 Ravi Badshami
 Arisha
 Himanshu Bawandar
 Aariz
 Dinesh Bawra
 Satyapal
 Gourav Mahna
 Monica Murthy

References

External links 

 Sabse Funny Kaun? on Flipkart
 

Hindi-language web series
2020 web series debuts
Indian web series